Hafez Kasseb (date of birth and death unknown) was an Egyptian football midfielder who played for Egypt in the 1934 FIFA World Cup. He also played for El-Olympi.

References

Egyptian footballers
Egypt international footballers
Association football midfielders
1934 FIFA World Cup players
Olympic Club (Egypt) players
Year of birth missing